Lee Patrick O'Connor (born 28 July 2000) is an Irish professional footballer who plays as a defender for EFL League Two club Tranmere Rovers, and the Republic of Ireland national team. He has also spent time on loan at Partick Thistle.

Club career

Early career
In 2016, O'Connor moved from Villa F.C. of Waterford to the Manchester United youth team, signing a three-year contract. On 6 August 2019, O'Connor played an EFL Trophy match for Manchester United U21s away to Rotherham United, winning 2–0 at the New York Stadium.

Celtic
In September 2019, O'Connor joined Celtic, signing a four-year contract until 2023.

Partick Thistle loan
In January 2020, O'Connor joined Scottish Championship club Partick Thistle on loan, joining Ian McCall's side for the second half of the season. He made his debut in senior club football on 25 January 2020, in a 2–1 loss to Arbroath. He made five appearances in all competitions for the club before the season was ended prematurely due to the COVID-19 pandemic.

Tranmere Rovers
O'Connor joined League Two club Tranmere Rovers on 17 August 2020 on a season-long loan. He made 42 appearances over the course of the season and returned to Celtic for pre-season. O'Connor returned to Tranmere Rovers on another season long loan on transfer deadline day, 31 August 2021. The transfer was made permanent in January 2022.

International career
O'Connor made his international debut, and recorded an assist, for the Republic of Ireland on 14 November 2019 in a friendly match against New Zealand. O'Connor was announced as the FAI Under-21 International Player of the Year for 2019 on 4 August 2020. O'Connor holds the record number of underage appearances for the Republic of Ireland with 78 appearances across all underage teams.

Career statistics

Club

International

Honours
Individual
 FAI Under-15 International Player of the Year: 2015
 FAI Under-19 International Player of the Year: 2018
 FAI Under-21 International Player of the Year: 2019

References

External links
 
 
 

2000 births
Living people
Sportspeople from Waterford (city)
Association footballers from County Waterford
Republic of Ireland association footballers
Republic of Ireland youth international footballers
Republic of Ireland under-21 international footballers
Republic of Ireland international footballers
Republic of Ireland expatriate association footballers
Irish expatriate sportspeople in England
Expatriate footballers in England
Irish expatriate sportspeople in Scotland
Expatriate footballers in Scotland
Association football defenders
Manchester United F.C. players
Celtic F.C. players
Partick Thistle F.C. players
Tranmere Rovers F.C. players
English Football League players